Love You So may refer to:

 "Love You So" (Delilah song), 2011
 "Love You So" (Ron Holden song), 1959
 "Love You So", a song by the King Khan & BBQ Show from the 2004 album The King Khan & BBQ Show LP

See also
 Love You So Much, a 2000 studio album by Kelly Chen